The 2017 Horizon League baseball tournament was held from May 24 through 27 at Les Miller Field at Curtis Granderson Stadium in Chicago, home to conference regular-season champion UIC. The top six finishers of the league's seven teams met in the double-elimination tournament. UIC won the tournament to earn the conference's automatic bid to the 2017 NCAA Division I baseball tournament.

Seeding and format
The league's teams were seeded 1 through 7 based on winning percentage in conference play. The last-place team did not qualify for the tournament, and the remaining six teams played a double-elimination tournament.

Bracket

Play-In Games

Remaining Bracket

References

Tournament
Horizon League Baseball Tournament
Horizon League baseball tournament
Horizon League baseball tournament
2010s in Chicago
Baseball in Chicago
College sports in Chicago
Sports competitions in Chicago